Iván Alexis Pillud (born 24 April 1986) is an Argentine professional footballer who plays for Racing Club de Avellaneda as a right-back.

Club career
Born in Capitán Bermúdez, Santa Fe Province, Pillud began his playing career in 2005 in the Argentine second division with Tiro Federal. In 2008, he made his Primera División debut after being loaned to Newell's Old Boys.

In July 2009, Pillud joined Spanish club RCD Espanyol, also on loan. He scarcely appeared during his only season, his debut coming on 30 August in a 1–0 La Liga away loss against Athletic Bilbao.

Pillud returned to his homeland for the 2010–11 campaign, signing for Racing Club de Avellaneda. On 31 January 2014 he moved teams and countries again, being loaned to Hellas Verona F.C. in Italy with an option for a permanent switch. He played his first game in Serie A on 23 March, coming on as 68th-minute substitute in a 5–0 defeat at U.C. Sampdoria.

International career
Pillud earned his first cap for Argentina on 16 March 2011, playing the first half of a 4–1 friendly win over Venezuela.

References

External links

1986 births
Living people
People from San Lorenzo Department
Argentine people of French descent
Sportspeople from Santa Fe Province
Argentine footballers
Association football defenders
Argentine Primera División players
Primera Nacional players
Tiro Federal footballers
Newell's Old Boys footballers
Racing Club de Avellaneda footballers
La Liga players
RCD Espanyol footballers
Serie A players
Hellas Verona F.C. players
Argentina international footballers
Argentine expatriate footballers
Expatriate footballers in Spain
Expatriate footballers in Italy
Argentine expatriate sportspeople in Spain
Argentine expatriate sportspeople in Italy